The Aeronautical Information Service, or AIS (French: , SIA) is a service established in support of international civil aviation, whose objective is to ensure the flow of information necessary for the safety, regularity, and efficiency of international air navigation.

The manner in which aeronautical information is gathered and managed is governed by Annex 15 to the Convention on International Civil Aviation (ICAO Annex 15), which defines how an aeronautical information service shall receive and/or originate, collate or assemble, edit, format, publish/store and distribute specified aeronautical information/data. The goal is to satisfy the need for uniformity and consistency in the provision of aeronautical information/data that is required for operational use by international civil aviation.

ICAO Annex 15 specifies that aeronautical information should be published as an integrated aeronautical information package (IAIP), composed of the following elements:

 The Aeronautical Information Publication (AIP), including amendment services
 AIP supplements
 Aeronautical Information Circulars (AIC)
 NOTAM (Notice to Airmen)—alerts aircraft pilots of any hazards en route or at a specific location
 Checklists and lists of valid NOTAM
 Pre-flight Information Bulletins (PIB)

Each element is used to distribute specific types of aeronautical information.

ICAO Annex 15
The ICAO Council first adopted the original Standards and Recommended Practices in 1953. Annex 15 has its origins in Article 37 of the Chicago Convention.

A total of 42 amendments updated Annex 15 over the years to meet the rapid changes brought about by air travel and associated information technology. In recent years, Annex 15 amendments have reflected the increased need for the timely provision of quality aeronautical information/data and terrain data as they have become critical components of data-dependent on-board navigation systems. The Annex now contains many provisions aimed at preventing corrupt or erroneous aeronautical information/data which can potentially affect the safety of air navigation.

The philosophy underlying Annex 15, which stems from Article 28 of the Convention on International Civil Aviation, is that each State is responsible for making available to civil aviation interests any and all information which is pertinent to and required for the operation of aircraft engaged in international civil aviation within its territory, as well as in areas outside its territory in which the State has air traffic control or other responsibilities.

Transition from AIS to AIM

Despite the age of the Internet, satellite navigation and computer networks, the approach to aeronautical information distribution is still based on paper charts, paper documentation and telex-based text messages. Much of the data is entered more than once in different computers using a keyboard rather than by file transfer or database transactions.

The computer-based navigation systems, and area navigation (RNAV), required navigation performance (RNP) and air traffic management requirements, introduced a need for new corresponding AIS requirements for quality and timeliness of aeronautical information.

The role of present AIS would need to transform to an information management service, changing duties, responsibilities and scope to satisfy these new requirements and to cope with and manage the provision of information. The definition of a future high-level view as to the shape, nature and content of a strategy for the evolution from traditional product-centric AIS to the enlarged scope of data-centric aeronautical information management (AIM) began and ICAO took the lead at the global level with regard to the transition from AIS to AIM.

The aeronautical information services must transition to a broader concept of aeronautical information management, with a different method of information provision and management given its data-centric nature as opposed to the product-centric nature of AIS. The expectations are that the transition to AIM will not involve many changes in terms of the scope of information to be distributed. The major change will be the increased emphasis on data distribution, which should place the future AIM in a position to better serve airspace users and air traffic management in terms of their information management requirements.

Aeronautical Information Service by Region/Country

Africa

Europe

South America

Asia

Not all contracting states of ICAO provide an online Aeronautical Information Service, and the following list may not be complete:

See also
 Flight service station

References 

 Annex 15 to the Convention on International Civil Aviation
 ICAO Roadmap for transition from AIS to AIM

External links
 EUROCONTROL's registry of Aeronautical information services around the world

Civil aviation
International air transport
International aviation organizations